Harvinder Mankkar (born 27 April 1964) is an Indian cartoonist, illustrator, script-writer and film director. He is well known for his comic series characters Motu Patlu published in Lot Pot magazine. Its 3D animated television series adaptation is airing on Nickelodeon. He has illustrated almost 22,000 pocket cartoons, comic strips, educational books and story books. He is founder and CEO of The Art Studio company. Also, he is the Creative Director and Chief Illustrator for Lot Pot magazine. He is Editorial Director of the film magazine Mayapuri.

Early life and background 
Harvinder Mankkar was born in Delhi to a Punjabi Hindu Rajput family. He was interested in creating illustrations and drawings when he was only 16 years old. He used to draw faces and illustrations from Coal pieces on the floors and walls and gradually with time that coal was replaced with the brush and ink pen. He sent his first pocket cartoon to Madhu Muskan magazine. The entry was accepted and published. This led to the start of his great career. Then, his cartoons got published in Lot Pot, Bal Bharti, Nandan, Champak, Balman, Chhona and many other magazines.

His characters Bhootnath, Mamaji and Amar-Akbar published in Nutan Chitrakatha gained huge popularity. His other characters that got famous are Chatkoo-Matkoo, Chutki, Natkhat Neetu and Jambaaz Deva. In 1980, he started the comic series Motu Patlu, whose ongoing success is a precedent. He has worked with many well known publishers over time.

He illustrated the life history of India's 11th President Dr. A. P. J. Abdul Kalam by the name of "APJ ABDUL KALAM - RAMESHWARAM TO RASHTARPATI BHAWAN". It was inaugurated by Abdul Kalam himself.

His first show as script-writer was Mayapuri Ilu Ilu telecasted on ATN TV. After that, he has written many fiction and film-based shows telecasted on Doordarshan, PTC Punjabi, Jaipur TV, ETV Urdu and many other channels. He created special drawings that were used by Pan Nalin for his Hollywood film Samsara released in 2001. He solely managed the roles of Script-writer, Dialogue-writer and Lyricist for the 3D animation movie Icy-n-Spicy. He is currently involved in script-writing and direction of many Corporate Live Shows.

Work 
Mankkar's work included feature films such as Hair is Falling and promotions such as Toonpur ka Superhero.
Hair is Falling (2011)

Awards and recognition 

 Rajiv Gandhi Global Excellence Awards 2013
 Arihant AGM Annual Award 2012 (Best Writer and Director)
 Faraar - Hindi Film (Best Promotion Award)
 Chetna Bharti Award (Best Script and Direction of Documentary – Taal Betaal Bhopal)
 Must Must Music Award (Lyrics and Direction of the Show)
 Honored by TRUWOOD for  Script-writing and Direction of Decode-7 Show
 Kalpna Lok Award 2013 (Most Versatile Artist of Decade)

References

External links
 
 Lot Pot Digital Editions
 Comic Con workshop with Harvinder Mankkar

1964 births
Living people
Indian cartoonists
Hindi-language film directors
Indian male screenwriters
20th-century Indian dramatists and playwrights
Screenwriters from Delhi
20th-century Indian male writers